Emmanuel d'Abreu was a Roman Catholic priest who joined the Jesuit order in 1724. He was deputed to Goa in 1733 and then in Macau in 1734. In March 1736, he was arrested in the kingdom of Tonkin (today's Vietnam). He was tortured and martyred by beheading for his work in the following year with three of his companions, John Gaspard Cratz, Bartholomew Alvarez and
Vincent da Cunha. Their memorial is on 12 January, the date of their execution.

References

Further reading
 salige Johannes Kasper Kratz, Emmanuel d'Abreu, Bartolomeus Álvarez og Vincent da Cunha (d. 1737) (Norwegian)

1708 births
1737 deaths
Beatified people
People from Aveiro District